Parus is a genus of Old World birds in the tit family. It was formerly a large genus containing most of the 50 odd species in the family Paridae. The genus was split into several resurrected genera following the publication of a detailed molecular phylogenetic analysis in 2013. The genus name, Parus, is the Latin for "tit".

Taxonomy
The genus Parus was introduced in 1758 by the Swedish naturalist Carl Linnaeus in the tenth edition of his Systema Naturae. The genus name is Latin for "tit". Of the 12 species included in the genus by Linnaeus, the type species was designated as the great tit (Parus major) by George Robert Gray in 1840.

Species
The genus now contains the following species:

Fossil record

Parus robustus (Pliocene of Csarnota, Hungary)  
Parus parvulus (Pliocene of Csarnota, Hungary) 
Parus medius (Pliocene of Beremend, Hungary)

References

Further reading
Gill, Frank B.; Slikas, Beth & Sheldon, Frederick H. (2005): Phylogeny of titmice (Paridae): II. Species relationships based on sequences of the mitochondrial cytochrome-b gene. Auk 122: 121–143. DOI: 10.1642/0004-8038(2005)122[0121:POTPIS]2.0.CO;2 HTML abstract

 
Paridae
Bird genera
 
Taxonomy articles created by Polbot